Anmar Almubaraki (born 1 July 1991) is an Iraqi professional footballer who plays as an attacking midfielder.

Club career
Born in Basra, Iraq, Almubaraki came to the Netherlands when only 2 years of age and started playing football with Hulzense Boys, later joining the FC Twente Football Academy.

He made his senior debut for Heracles Almelo in the 2010–11 season, against Roda JC. He left them for FC Emmen in summer 2012, and later joined Telstar, before moving abroad to play for Turkish second division side Denizlispor. He left Denizlispor after 7 months, claiming the club owed him several months' wages.

In April 2017, Almubaraki signing a one-season contract with Persiba Balikpapan in the Liga indonesia. he playing 29 games, scoring 8 goals and 3 assist for Persiba Balikpapan.

In January 2018, he signed a one-year contract with Thai side Army United. Anmar scored goal first against Khon Kaen FC. He moved to Malaysian club Kedah FA in November 2018.

International career
In June 2011, he and some other European-based players, were called up to train with the Iraq national football team by the coach Wolfgang Sidka. When he arrived in Iraq he got a lot of attention. He played several friendly matches against Iraqi clubs.

References

External links

1991 births
Living people
Sportspeople from Basra
Dutch people of Iraqi descent
Association football midfielders
Iraqi footballers
Dutch footballers
Heracles Almelo players
FC Emmen players
SC Telstar players
Denizlispor footballers
Eredivisie players
Eerste Divisie players
Dutch expatriate footballers
Expatriate footballers in Turkey
Expatriate footballers in Sweden
Expatriate footballers in Indonesia
Dutch expatriate sportspeople in Turkey
Dutch expatriate sportspeople in Sweden
Dutch expatriate sportspeople in Indonesia
TFF First League players